Khoo Chung Chiat (born 28 September 1986) is a Malaysian badminton player. He was part of the Malaysian junior team that won the bronze medal at the 2004 Asian Junior Championships in the boys' team event. In the senior event, he was the men's doubles champion at the 2007 Singapore Cheers Asian Satellite in the men's doubles event partnered with Chang Hun Pin. Teamed-up with Mohd Razif Abdul Latif, they finished as the runner-up at the 2006 Sri Lanka Satellite and 2007 Malaysia International tournament. Khoo played at the 2007 Southeast Asian Games, winning the bronze medal in the men's team event.

Achievements

BWF International Challenge/Series
Men's doubles

 BWF International Challenge tournament
 BWF International Series tournament

References

External links
 

1986 births
Living people
People from Alor Setar
Malaysian sportspeople of Chinese descent
Malaysian male badminton players
Competitors at the 2007 Southeast Asian Games
Southeast Asian Games bronze medalists for Malaysia
Southeast Asian Games medalists in badminton
21st-century Malaysian people